The Thomas C. Black House, also known as Old Black Place, is a historic house in Murfreesboro, Tennessee, U.S..

History
The house was built circa 1820, and significantly expanded in the 1850s. It belonged to Samuel P. Black and his wife, Fannie Sanders, and it was later inherited by their son Thomas. Samuel Black was an educator, and one of his students was future U.S. president James K. Polk, who visited the house many times.

The house remained in the Black family until 1954.

Architectural significance
The house was designed in the Italianate and Greek Revival architectural styles. It has been listed on the National Register of Historic Places since July 5, 1996.

References

Houses on the National Register of Historic Places in Tennessee
Greek Revival architecture in Tennessee
Italianate architecture in Tennessee
Houses completed in 1820
Buildings and structures in Rutherford County, Tennessee